Dinuka Dilshan (born 24 May 2000) is a Sri Lankan cricketer. He made his first-class debut on 21 February 2020, for Moors Sports Club in the 2019–20 Premier League Tournament, scoring a century in the first innings. He made his Twenty20 debut on 9 March 2021, for Moors Sports Club in the 2020–21 SLC Twenty20 Tournament. He made his List A debut on 7 April 2021, for Moors Sports Club in the 2020–21 Major Clubs Limited Over Tournament.

References

External links
 

2000 births
Living people
Sri Lankan cricketers
Moors Sports Club cricketers
Place of birth missing (living people)